Lauzon is a French surname with significant usage in Canada.

Notable people
Craig Lauzon (born 1971), Canadian actor
Dan Lauzon (born 1988), American MMA fighter
Edythe Morahan de Lauzon, Canadian poet
Gilles Lauzon (1631–1687), French coppersmith
Guy Lauzon (born 1944), Canadian politician
Jack M. Lauzon (born 1961), Canadian horse racing jockey
Jani Lauzon (born 1959), Canadian puppeteer and musician
Jason Lauzon (born 1990), Canadian footballer
Jean-Baptiste Lauzon (1858–1944), Canadian politician
Jean-Claude Lauzon (1953–1997), Canadian filmwriter
Jean de Lauzon (1586–1666), French lawyer and governor of New France
Jérémy Lauzon (born 1997), Canadian ice hockey defenceman
Joe Lauzon (born 1984), American MMA fighter
Léo-Paul Lauzon (born 1946), Canadian professor
Patrice Lauzon (born 1975), Canadian ice dancing coach
Pierre de Lauzon (1687–1742), French missionary
Stéphane Lauzon (born 1966), Canadian politician

Surnames of French origin
Surnames of Philippine origin
French-language surnames
Tagalog-language surnames